The 1997 Tournoi de France (French, 'Tournament of France'), often referred to as Le Tournoi, was an international football tournament held in France in early June 1997 as a warm-up to the 1998 FIFA World Cup. The four national teams participating at the tournament were Brazil, England, hosts France, and Italy. They played against each other in a single round-robin tournament with the group winner also being the winner of the tournament.

Event 

England won the tournament after collecting six points by winning their first two matches, against Italy and France, and losing one to Brazil. Brazil were second with five points, a product of a win and two draws. Their 3–3 draw with Italy included two goals from then 22-year-old Alessandro Del Piero and one goal apiece from Romário and Ronaldo as well as one own goal from each of the teams. Del Piero was the top goalscorer of the tournament with three goals scored while Romário scored twice.			

In the 21st minute of the opening match between France and Brazil, Roberto Carlos scored his famous Banana Shot free kick goal, curling from a 33.13-metre distance and often considered to be one of the best in the modern game.

Elo Ratings before the tournament

Venues

Squads

Table

Results

Statistics

Goalscorers

Broadcasters 
  Rai 1
  FORTA
  SVT
  Fox Sports (English), Telemundo (Spanish)
  Globo

See also 
 1998 FIFA World Cup

References

External links
RSSSF

 
1997
1997
1996–97 in English football
1996–97 in French football
1996–97 in Italian football
1997 in Brazilian football
1998 FIFA World Cup
June 1997 sports events in Europe
International men's association football invitational tournaments